Miss Poitou-Charentes is a French beauty pageant which selects a representative for the Miss France national competition from the region of Poitou-Charentes. Women representing the region under various different titles have competed at Miss France since 1957, although the Miss Poitou-Charentes title was not used regularly until 2006.

The current Miss Poitou-Charentes is Marine Paulais, who was crowned Miss Poitou-Charentes 2022 on 30 September 2022. Three women from Poitou-Charentes have been crowned Miss France:
Monique Chiron, who was crowned Miss France 1959, competing as Miss Poitou
Claudine Cassereau, who was crowned Miss France 1971, competing as Miss Poitou, following the resignation of the original winner
Véronique Fagot, who was crowned Miss France 1977, competing as Miss Poitou

Results summary
Miss France: Monique Chiron (1958; Miss Poitou); Véronique Fagot (1976; Miss Poitou)
1st Runner-Up: Monique Boucher (1965; Miss Charente); Béatrice Demiaud (1966; Miss Royan); Nadine Labadie Wolf (1970; Miss Côte de Beauté); Claudine Cassereau (1971; Miss Poitou; later Miss France)
2nd Runner-Up: Marine Clouet (2000; Miss Poitou)
3rd Runner-Up: Michèle Mouix (1966; Miss Aunis)
5th Runner-Up: Mathilde Muller (2008)
Top 12/Top 15: Stéphanie Loizeau (1995); Nancy Bourgeix (1996); Alexandra Bauduin (1997); Andréa Galland (2019); Justine Dubois (2020); Marine Paulais (2022)

Titleholders
The regional title has been known as Miss Poitou-Charentes since 1997, while from 1995 to 1996, it was known as Miss Charentes-Poitou.

Miss Charente
In 1965, the department of Charente crowned its own representative for Miss France. In 1976, the department crowned its own representative again under the title Miss Angoulême.

Miss Charente-Maritime
In the 1960s and 1970s, the department of Charente-Maritime crowned its own representative for Miss France under various titles, including Miss Aunis (1966), Miss Côte de Beauté (1962; 1970), Miss La Rochelle (1976), Miss Oléron (1967), Miss Royan (1966), Miss Saintes (1962), and Miss Saintonge (1977).

Miss Charentes
From the 1970s to the 2000s, the departments of Charente and Charente-Maritime competed separately under the title Miss Charentes.

Miss Deux-Sèvres
In 1970, the department of Deux-Sèvres crowned its own representative for Miss France.

Miss Poitou
From the 1950s to the 2000s, the departments of Deux-Sèvres, Vendée, and Vienne competed separately under the title Miss Poitou. Vendée is now located in Pays de la Loire, but women from the department were eligible to compete due to its historical ties to Poitou-Charentes.

Miss Vienne
In 1979, the department of Vienne crowned its own representative for Miss France.

Notes

References

External links

Miss France regional pageants
Beauty pageants in France
Women in France